Marcel Landers (born 24 August 1984 in Oberhausen, North Rhine-Westphalia) is a retired German footballer and current head coach of DJK Arminia Klosterhardt.

Career

Club career
Marcel Landers was born in Oberhausen and began his career at Rot-Weiß Oberhausen. After he had gone through all youth teams, he was promoted to the second team where he played until 2005, before being promoted to the first team that played in the Regionalliga Nord.  He made his debut on the professional league level in the 2. Bundesliga for Rot-Weiß Oberhausen on 24 August 2008 when he started a game against FC Ingolstadt 04.

After the 2010/11 season for Rot-Weiß Oberhausen ended with relegation to the 3. Liga, Landers signed a two-year contract with the Regionalliga team Wuppertaler SV in June 2011. In January 2013, he terminated his contract there and returned to Rot-Weiß Oberhausen. For the 2014/15 season, he was captain of the Oberhausen U-23 reserve. In January 2016 he joined the national league club DJK Arminia Klosterhardt. In April 2017, he was also appointed player-assistant coach under new head coach Michael Lorenz. At the end of the season, he continued as a youth coach for the club. On 27 May 2019, he was promoted as the club's new head coach.

References

External links
 

1984 births
Living people
Sportspeople from Oberhausen
German footballers
German football managers
Rot-Weiß Oberhausen players
2. Bundesliga players
Association football midfielders
Footballers from North Rhine-Westphalia